Mystic Lake can refer to:
Mystic Lake (California)
Mystic Lakes (Boston, Massachusetts), a series of lakes in Boston
Mystic Lake (Washington), in Mount Rainier National Park
Mystic Lake (Marstons Mills), in Marstons Mills, Massachusetts
Mystic Lake (Beaverhead County, Montana) in Beaverhead County, Montana
Mystic Lake (Gallatin County, Montana) in Gallatin County, Montana
Mystic Lake (Stillwater County, Montana) in Stillwater County, Montana
Mystic Lake Casino, a casino on the Shakopee-Mdewakanton Indian Reservation near Shakopee and Prior Lake, Minnesota